Trogonoptera brookiana, Rajah Brooke's birdwing, is a birdwing butterfly from the rainforests of the Thai-Malay Peninsula, Borneo, Natuna, Sumatra, and various small islands west of Sumatra (Banyak, Simeulue, Batu and Mentawai). The butterfly was named by the naturalist Alfred Russel Wallace in 1855, after James Brooke, the Rajah of Sarawak. The larval host plants are Aristolochia acuminata and A. foveolata. Adults sip flower nectar from plants such as Bauhinia. Rajah Brooke's birdwing is a protected species, listed under Appendix II of CITES, meaning that international export is restricted to those who have been granted a permit. It is the national butterfly of Malaysia.

Description
Both sexes resemble the more restricted relative, the Palawan birdwing, but males of Rajah Brooke's birdwing have more green to the hindwings. The wings of males are mainly black. Each forewing has seven tooth-shaped electric-green markings, while there is a relatively large electric-green patch on the hindwings. The head is bright red and the body is black with red markings. The wings of females are browner with prominent white flashes at the tips of the forewings and at the base of the hindwings.

Taxonomy
Genus: Trogonoptera Rippon, 1890
Species: Trogonoptera brookiana Wallace, 1855
Subspecies: Trogonoptera brookiana brookiana (Wallace, 1855)
Form: Trogonoptera brookiana brookiana f. brookiana Wallace, 1855
Form: Trogonoptera brookiana brookiana f. julijae S.Hu, 2007
Subspecies: Trogonoptera brookiana toshikii Kobayashi, 1991
Subspecies: Trogonoptera brookiana akikoa Morita, 1994
Species: Trogonoptera trojana Honrath, 1886

Illustrations

References

Further reading

 
 
 

Papilionidae
Butterflies of Indochina
Butterflies of Borneo
Butterflies of Indonesia
Butterflies of Malaysia
Butterflies described in 1855